Charles Gotthold Reichel (14 July 1751 in Hermsdorf, Silesia – 18 April 1825 at Niesky, Prussia) was a Moravian bishop.

Biography
He was educated in the Moravian college and theological seminary of Germany. In 1784 he went to the United States in order to open a boarding school for boys at Nazareth, Pennsylvania which was still in operation by the end of the 19th century, and over which he presided, as its first principal, for 16 years. Having been appointed presiding bishop of the southern district of the Moravian church, he was consecrated to the episcopacy in 1801.

During his residence at Salem, North Carolina, the University of North Carolina conferred on him the degree of D.D. In 1811 he was appointed presiding bishop of the northern district of the church, and moved to Bethlehem. In 1818 he attended the general synod at Herrnhut, Saxony, after which he remained in Europe and retired from active service.

See also
 Nazareth Hall

Notes

References

1751 births
1825 deaths
19th-century Moravian bishops
People from Głogów County
University of North Carolina at Chapel Hill alumni
People from Nazareth, Pennsylvania
People from Salem, North Carolina
Religious leaders from Pennsylvania